K. Velayudhan Nair, better known by his stage name Crossbelt Mani (22 April 1935 – 30 October 2021), was an Indian film director and cinematographer, who worked in the Malayalam cinema. He directed more than 40 Malayalam movies and worked as a cinematographer for ten movies. He became popular with his second movie Cross Belt in 1970 and adopted Crossbelt to his name. Veteran director Joshiy worked as an assistant director under him.

Personal life

Velayudhan Nair with the stage name Crossbelt Mani hailed from Thiruvananthapuram. He was born to Valiyashalayil Madhavivilasathu Krishna Pillai and Kamalamma on 22 April 1935. He was married to Iranayil Bhagavathimandirathu Sreemathiyamma. They had a son, Krishnakumar, and a daughter, Roopa.

Mani died on 30 October 2021, at the age of 86 at his home in Thiruvananthapuram. He was suffering from various illnesses associated with old age at the time of his death.

Filmography

Direction

 Midumidukki (1968)
 Cross Belt (1970)
 Manushyabandhangal (1972)
 Puthrakameshti (1972)
 Naadan Premam (1972)
 Shakthi (1972)
 Kaapaalika (1973)
 Nadeenadanmaare Aavasyamundu (1974)
 Velicham Akale (1975)
 Penpada (1975)
 Kuttichaathan (1975)
 Thaamarathoni (1975)
 Chottaanikkara Amma (1976)
 Yudhabhoomi (1976)
 Neethipeedham (1977)
 Penpuli (1977)
 Pattaalam Janaki (1977)
 Aanayum Ambaariyum (1978)
 Black Belt (1978)
 Pancharathnam (1979)
 Youvanam Daaham (1980)
 Eettappuli (1983)
 Thimingalam (1983)
 Bullet (1984)
 Chorakku Chora (1985)
 Black Mail (1985)
 Revenge (1985)
 Ottayaan (1985)
 Kulambadikal (1986)
 Pensimham (1986)
 Urukkumanushyan (1986)
 Naaradan Keralathil (1987)
 Devadas (1989)
 Commander (1990)

Cinematography
 Bullet (1984)
Chorakku Chora (1985)
Black Mail (1985)
 Revenge (1985)
Ottayaan (1985)
Kulambadikal (1986)
Urukkumanushyan (1986)
Naaradan Keralathil (1987)
 Commander (1990)

References

External links

1935 births
2021 deaths
Malayalam film cinematographers
Malayalam film directors
Film directors from Thiruvananthapuram
20th-century Indian film directors
20th-century Indian photographers
Cinematographers from Kerala